Bill McCarthy (6 August 1874 – 21 November 1940) was an Australian rules footballer who played with Fitzroy and Essendon in the Victorian Football League (VFL).

References

Sources
Holmesby, Russell & Main, Jim (2009). The Encyclopedia of AFL Footballers. 8th ed. Melbourne: Bas Publishing.

Essendon Football Club profile

Australian rules footballers from Victoria (Australia)
Fitzroy Football Club players
Essendon Football Club players
Footscray Football Club (VFA) players
1874 births
1940 deaths